John Long (c. 1517 – c. 1600/1602) was an English politician.

He was a member (MP) of the Parliament of England for Knaresborough in April 1554, Hedon in November 1554, Shaftesbury in 1563 and Newcastle-under-Lyme in 1571.

His father Henry and brother Robert were also MPs.

References

1510s births
1600s deaths
Members of the Parliament of England for Newcastle-under-Lyme
English MPs 1554
English MPs 1554–1555
English MPs 1563–1567
English MPs 1571
John
Members of the Parliament of England for Hedon